Gregory A. Voth (born January 22, 1959) is a theoretical chemist and Haig P. Papazian Distinguished Service Professor of Chemistry at the
University of Chicago. He is also a Professor of the James Franck Institute and the Institute for Biophysical Dynamics.

Education
He received his bachelor's degree from University of Kansas in 1981 with highest distinction and honors and a Ph.D. in theoretical chemistry from the California Institute of Technology in 1987. His doctoral advisor was Rudolph A. Marcus. He was also an IBM Postdoctoral Fellow at the University of California, Berkeley from 1987-1989. At Berkeley, his postdoctoral advisors were William Hughes Miller and David Chandler.

Career
Professor Voth is interested in the development and application of theoretical and computational methods to study problems involving the structure and dynamics of complex condensed phase systems, including proteins, membranes, liquids, and materials. He has developed a method known as “multiscale coarse-graining” in which the resolution of the molecular-scale entities is reduced into simpler structures, but key information on their interactions is accurately retained (or renormalized) so the resulting computer simulation can accurately and efficiently predict the properties of large assemblies of complex molecules such as lipids and proteins. This method is multiscale, meaning it describes complex condensed phase and biomolecular systems from the molecular scale to the mesoscale and ultimately to the macroscopic scale. Professor Voth’s other research interests include the study of charge transport (protons and electrons) in aqueous systems and biomolecules – a fundamental process in living organisms and other systems that have been poorly understood because of its complexity. He also studies the exotic behavior of room-temperature ionic liquids and other complex materials such nanoparticle self-assembly, polymer electrolyte membranes, and electrode-electrolyte interfaces in energy storage devices. In the earlier part of his career, Professor Voth extensively developed and applied new methods to study quantum and electron transfer dynamics in condensed phase systems-much of this work was based on the Feynman path integral description of quantum mechanics.

As of 03/12/2023, he is the author or co-author of more than 600 peer-reviewed scientific articles (Google Scholar h-index = 120; total citations = 55,964) and has mentored more than 200 postdoctoral fellows and graduate students.

Honors and awards
 Biophysical Society Innovation Award, 2021. Biophysical Society
 S F Boys-A Rahman Award Winner, 2019. Royal Society of Chemistry 
 ACS Joel Henry Hildebrand Award in the Theoretical and Experimental Chemistry of Liquids 
 ACS Division of Physical Chemistry Award in Theoretical Chemistry 
 Stanislaw M. Ulam Distinguished Scholar, Los Alamos National Laboratory,
 Elected to the International Academy of Quantum Molecular Science
 Fellow of the Biophysical Society
 Fellow of the American Chemical Society
 University of Utah Distinguished Scholarly and Creative Research Award John Simon Guggenheim Fellowship,
 Miller Visiting Professorship, University of California, Berkeley
 National Science Foundation Creativity Award
 Fellow of the American Association for the Advancement of Science
 Fellow of the American Physical Society
 IBM Corporation Faculty Research Award
 Camille Dreyfus Teacher-Scholar Award
 Alfred P. Sloan Foundation Research Fellow
 Presidential Young Investigator Award
 David and Lucile Packard Foundation Fellowship in Science and Engineering
 Camille and Henry Dreyfus Distinguished New Faculty Award
 Francis and Milton Clauser Doctoral Prize, California Institute of Technology
 Herbert Newby McCoy Award, California Institute of Technology and the Procter and Gamble Award for Outstanding Research in Physical Chemistry, ACS

References

External links
 Voth Group home page

1959 births
Living people
American physical chemists
University of Chicago faculty
California Institute of Technology alumni
University of Kansas alumni
University of Utah faculty
Fellows of the American Physical Society
Fellows of the American Chemical Society
Sloan Research Fellows
Fellows of the American Academy of Arts and Sciences
Theoretical chemists
Scientists from Kansas
People from Topeka, Kansas
20th-century American chemists
21st-century American chemists